Reicheadella is a genus of beetles in the family Carabidae, containing the following species:

 Reicheadella aetolica Giachino & Vailati, 2004
 Reicheadella bischoffi (Meschnigg, 1933)
 Reicheadella cephalonica (A. Winkler, 1911)
 Reicheadella corcyrea (Reitter, 1884)
 Reicheadella imathiae Casale, Giachino, Jalžić & Vailati, 1998
 Reicheadella lakotai (Magrini & Bulirsch, 2005)
 Reicheadella smetanai Bulirsch & Guéorguiev, 2008
 Reicheadella xanthina Casale, Giachino, Jalžić & Vailati, 1998
 Reicheadella zoufali (Reitter, 1913)

References

Scaritinae